Yukari Miyata (宮田由佳里 Miyata Yukari, born June 27, 1989) is a Japanese volleyball player who plays for Toray Arrows.

Profiles 
While attending Kyushubunka Gakuen high school, the volleyball team won the top of Japanese high school with Honami Tsukiji and Saki Minemura.

Clubs 
 Kyushubunka high school
 Toray Arrows (2008–)

Awards

Individual 
2008-2009 V.Premier League - New face award

Team 
2008 Domestic Sports Festival (Volleyball) -  Runner-Up, with Toray Arrows
2008-2009 V.Premier League -  Champion, with Toray Arrows
2009 Kurowashiki All Japan Volleyball Championship -  Champion, with Toray Arrows
2009-2010 V.Premier League -  Champion, with Toray Arrows
2010 Kurowashiki All Japan Volleyball Championship -  Champion, with Toray Arrows
2010-11 V.Premier League -  Runner-up, with Toray Arrows

References

External links
Toray Arrows Women's Volleyball Team

1989 births
Living people
Sportspeople from Nagasaki Prefecture
Japanese women's volleyball players